JD Scott is a Brooklyn, New York and Tampa, Florida based poet and writer. They are the winner of the 2018 Madeleine P. Plonsker Emerging Writers Residency Prize, which produced the story collection Moonflower, Nightshade, All the Hours of the Day. The collection has been positively covered by multiple literary periodicals including Tor.com, The Rumpus, Electric Literature, and Lambda Literary. They are also the author of two poetry chapbooks, Night Errands (winner of the 2012 Peter Meinke Prize for Poetry) and FUNERALS & THRONES, published with Birds of Lace. Their debut full length poetry collection, Mask for Mask, was released from New Rivers Press in 2021  and was described by Publishers Weekly as a "startling", "memorable and energetic debut." Their writing has been anthologized in BAX 2015: Best American Experimental Writing and Best New Poets 2017. Scott's writing has been described as full of "something ominous, wolf-like lurking" and "unsurpassable in its #sorrynotsorry earnestness".

Scott was a Lambda Literary Fellow and edited the Emerge: 2018 Lambda Fellows Anthology. They were the editor of Moonshot, a literary magazine, and are the current editor of AADOREE. Scott has been committed to building literary community in multiple locations, founding the reading series Sacred Grove in Tuscaloosa, AL and Moveable Beasts: A Reading Series That Roams in Tampa, FL.

Bibliography
Mask for Mask Moorhead, MN. New Rivers Press. 2021
Moonflower, Nightshade, All the Hours of the Day Lake Forest, IL. Lake Forest Press/&NOW Books. 2020
FUNERALS & THRONES Athens, GA. Birds of Lace. 2013
Night Errands Tampa, FL. YellowJacket Press. 2012

Short fiction

References

External links

Living people
21st-century American poets
Writers from Tampa, Florida
Poets from Florida
Writers from Brooklyn
Poets from New York (state)
21st-century American male writers
Year of birth missing (living people)
University of Alabama alumni
Non-binary writers